Andrey Borisovich Perlov (born 12 December 1961 in Novosibirsk, Soviet Union) is a retired race walker who represented the USSR and later Russia.

Career 
Perlov won the gold medal over 50 kilometres at the 1992 Summer Olympics in Barcelona. He also won the 1990 European Championships as well as silver medals at the 1991 World Championships and the IAAF World Race Walking Cup in 1985 and 1989.

At the 1991 World Championships, Perlov and his teammate Aleksandr Potashov attempted to cross the goal line simultaneously, resulting in a shared gold medal, but the officials declared Potashov the winner by 0.01 second.

Perlov's personal best time is 3:37:41 in the 50 kilometres, which places him 16th in the all-time performers list.

International competitions

References

External links

Bibliography 

1961 births
Living people
Sportspeople from Novosibirsk
Russian male racewalkers
Soviet male racewalkers
Olympic athletes of the Unified Team
Olympic gold medalists for the Unified Team
Athletes (track and field) at the 1992 Summer Olympics
World Athletics Championships athletes for the Soviet Union
World Athletics Championships medalists
European Athletics Championships medalists
World record setters in athletics (track and field)
Olympic gold medalists in athletics (track and field)
Universiade medalists in athletics (track and field)
Universiade silver medalists for the Soviet Union
Medalists at the 1992 Summer Olympics
Medalists at the 1985 Summer Universiade
Friendship Games medalists in athletics